The double-lined mackerel (Grammatorcynus bilineatus), is a species of Spanish mackerel (tribe Scomberomorini)  in the family Scombridae. This species is sometimes also called the scad mackerel.

Distribution and habitat
This species is present in the tropical and subtropical Indo-Pacific, from the Red Sea to the Andaman Sea, also from the northern coast of Australia to the Ryukyu Islands, as far as Fiji.

Habitat
These subtropical reef-associated and oceanodromous fishes usually inhabit open water but they are mostly found in shallow waters at depths of 15 to 50 m.

Description

The double-lined mackerel has an elongated and slightly compressed body covered with small flakes with a relatively small mouth and large eyes. The body color is dark blue on the back, silvery on the sides, silvery white on the belly. The dorsal fins are two, separated by a short space. These fishes have eleven- thirteen dorsal spines, ten- fourteen dorsal soft rays and ten-fourteen anal soft rays. The pectoral fins are rather short. There are two lateral lines, one on the dorsal profile, and the other at the height of the pectoral fins.

Before 1983, this species was sometimes confused with Grammatorcynus bicarinatus, the shark mackerel.

Biology
Grammatorcynus bilineatus mainly feed on crustaceans and fishes, especially Clupeiformes (Sardinella and Thryssa species), but also other fishes such as triggerfishes (Balistes) and barracudas (Sphyraena). It usually forms large schools.

Fisheries
The double-lined mackerel is a commercial fish, usually marketed canned and frozen.

Bibliography 
 Fenner, Robert M.: The Conscientious Marine Aquarist. Neptune City, USA: T.F.H. Publications, 2001.
 Helfman, G., B. Collette y D. Facey: The diversity of fishes. Blackwell Science, Malden, Massachusetts, USA, 1997
 Hoese, D.F. 1986: . A M.M. Smith y P.C. Heemstra (eds.) Smiths' sea fishes. Springer-Verlag, Berlín.
 Maugé, L.A. 1986.  A J. Daget, J.-P. Gosse y D.F.E. Thys van den Audenaerde (eds.) Check-list of the freshwater fishes of África. Vol. 2.
 Moyle, P. y J. Cech.: Fishes: An Introduction to Ichthyology, 4th. ed, Upper Saddle River, USA - Prentice-Hall. 2000.
 Nelson, J.: Fishes of the World, 3rd ed.USA: John Wiley and Sons. 1994.
 Wheeler, A.: The World Encyclopedia of Fishes, 2nd. Ed. London: Macdonald. 1985.

References

External links
 

Scombridae
Fish described in 1836
Grammatorcynus